Otto Egon Lowenstein FRSE (1906–1999) was a German-born zoologist. He did extensive studies on the labyrinth of the ears of fish.

Life
He was born in Munich on 24 October 1906, to a Jewish family. He studied Sciences at the University of Munich. He was taught Zoology by Karl von Frisch. He continued to postgraduate level gaining a PhD in 1932.

In 1933 he left Germany and went to Britain. He began as a research student at the University of Birmingham, gaining a second PhD in 1937. In that year he took a post as Assistant Lecturer in Zoology at Exeter University. In 1938 he went to Glasgow University as a Lecturer under Prof Edward Hindle. In 1952 he was given a professorship at the University of Birmingham.

He was elected a Fellow of the Royal Society of Edinburgh in 1947. His proposers were Maurice Yonge, Charles Wynford Parsons, John Walton and George Wyburn. In 1955 he was also elected a Fellow of the Royal Society of London.

He retired in 1974. He died on 31 January 1999.

Family
In 1937, he married Elsa Ritter. He secondly married Gunilla Dohlman (d.1981). He finally (aged 80) married Maureen McKernan in 1986.

References

1906 births
1999 deaths
Jewish emigrants from Nazi Germany to the United Kingdom
Scientists from Munich
Academics of the University of Glasgow
Academics of the University of Birmingham
Fellows of the Royal Society of Edinburgh